Jimmy Giuffre 3 is the 1957 debut album by the Jimmy Giuffre 3.

Track listing
 "Gotta Dance" - 2:29
 "Two Kinds of Blues" - 5:10
 "The Song Is You" (Oscar Hammerstein II, Jerome Kern) - 3:52
 "Crazy She Calls Me" (Bob Russell, Carl Sigman) - 5:14
 "Voodoo" - 2:48
 "My All" (Giuffre, Russell) - 4:09
 "That's the Way It Is" - 3:45
 "Crawdad Suite" - 7:10
 "The Train and the River" - 3:31

All songs written by Jimmy Giuffre unless otherwise noted.

Personnel
Jimmy Giuffre - clarinet, tenor saxophone, baritone saxophone
Ralph Peña - bass
Jim Hall - guitar

References

1958 debut albums
Atlantic Records albums
Jimmy Giuffre albums